Raspberries is the debut album from the Raspberries, released in April 1972 (see 1972 in music). It was their second-highest charting LP, reaching #51 on the Billboard album chart, but spent more weeks on the chart than all of their other albums combined.

The American and Australian versions of this LP carried a scratch and sniff sticker with a strong raspberry scent.

It contained two charting singles, "Don't Want to Say Goodbye," which reached #86, and their biggest hit, "Go All the Way," which reached #5.

This album was re-released on CD as part of the 'Power Pop Vol. 1,' also containing their second album Fresh.

Track listing

Charts

Band members
Eric Carmen - bass guitar, lead and backing vocals, piano
Wally Bryson - lead guitar, backing and lead vocals
Dave Smalley - rhythm guitar, backing and lead vocals
Jim Bonfanti -  drums, backing vocals

References

Raspberries (band) albums
1972 debut albums
Albums produced by Jimmy Ienner
Albums recorded at Record Plant (New York City)
Capitol Records albums